Norman Macgeorge (8 July 1872 – 2 September 1952) was an artist and art critic in the colony and State of Victoria.

History
Norman Macgeorge, artist and collector, was a son of Rachel Elizabeth Macgeorge, née Luxmoore and Alexander Macgeorge, and grandson of Robert Forsyth Macgeorge, prosperous tailors and drapers of Hindley Street then King William Street in Adelaide, South Australia.

He was educated at St Peter's College, Adelaide and studied art at the School of Design in Adelaide under H. P. Gill, and between the years 1891 and 1895 taught art classes at Glenelg Grammar, Queen's College, and Hahndorf College, then moved to Melbourne to continue his studies at the National Gallery School. After failing to win a travelling scholarship in 1899, he made his own way to Britain and Europe, where he visited major centres of art.

He taught freehand drawing at Wesley College, Melbourne, Melbourne Teachers' College, and Melbourne Church of England Grammar School. He married in 1911 and engaged Harold Desbrowe-Annear to build, in bushland at the junction of Darebin Creek and the Yarra River, at 25 Riverside Road, Ivanhoe, a residence "Ballangeich" which remained their lifelong home and a popular gathering place for artists. Now known as "Macgeorge House", it is used by the University of Melbourne to host visiting artists-in-residence.

Norman was a prominent member of the Australian Art Association and its second president, and in 1938 helped found the Contemporary Art Society. He wrote regularly on the arts for the Melbourne Herald.

Legacy
Childless, Norman died in 1952 and his wife in 1970, leaving their estate to the University of Melbourne, where it continues to fund the Norman Macgeorge Scholarship which ...
provides PhD students in the visual, creative and performing arts, music, architecture, conservation, literature, creative writing, language, history, philosophy and anthropology at the University of Melbourne with financial assistance to travel overseas on a research trip.

Works
Mother of Pearl (1906) held by the National Gallery of Victoria
Beach scene with man and woman and
Venice (1930)
held by the Ian Potter Gallery of the University of Melbourne.
The University also has a large portrait of Macgeorge, painted by his friend and near-neighbour Napier Waller.

Bibliography
Norman Macgeorge Borovansky Ballet in Australia and New Zealand (1946)
Norman Macgeorge The Arts in Australia (1948)

Family
Norman Macgeorge married May Ina Hepburn (5 May 1882 – 27 August 1970) of Mornington, Victoria on 25 January 1911. May was granddaughter of John Stuart Hepburn. They had no children.

An uncle, James Macgeorge, an Adelaide architect, was a prominent member of the South Australian Society of Arts. A family chart, which features a number of notable people, can be found here.

References 

Australian art critics
1872 births
1952 deaths
20th-century Australian painters
20th-century Australian male artists
Australian male painters
Australian people of Scottish descent
People educated at St Peter's College, Adelaide
Artists from Adelaide
National Gallery of Victoria Art School alumni